Franziska Mally (born 31 October 1916) was an Austrian swimmer. She competed in the women's 4 × 100 metre freestyle relay at the 1936 Summer Olympics. Mally was in the freestyle relay with Grete Ittlinger, Roma Wagner and Elli von Kropiwnicki but they failed to make the first three, and the finals, by coming last in the first semi-final.

References

External links
 

1916 births
Possibly living people
Austrian female freestyle swimmers
Olympic swimmers of Austria
Swimmers at the 1936 Summer Olympics
Place of birth missing